Santa Caterina Villarmosa (Sicilian: Santa Catarina) is a comune (municipality) in the Province of Caltanissetta in the Italian region of Sicily.

The local economy is mostly based on agriculture (grain, olives, almonds).

References

External links 
 Selected Civil Records

Cities and towns in Sicily